Nickel plating may refer to:

Nickel electroplating, a technique of electroplating a thin layer of nickel onto a metal object
Electroless nickel plating, an auto-catalytic chemical technique used to deposit a layer of nickel-phosphorus or nickel-boron alloy on a solid workpiece